Anticona (possibly from Quechua for metals or minerals, the inhabitants of the rainforest or the Andes), also called Ticlio, is a mountain in the Andes of Peru, about  high. It is located in the Lima Region, Huarochiri Province, Chicla District, and in the Junín Region, Yauli Province, Morococha District. Anticona lies between the Ticlio mountain pass in the southwest and Yanashinga in the northeast, northwest of a lake named Huacracocha.

References

Mountains of Peru
Mountains of Lima Region
Mountains of Junín Region